The Inventors is a Canadian science biography television program which aired on CBC Television in 1979.

Premise
Bob Fortune hosted this Vancouver-produced program featuring the stories of Canadian inventors and their inventions.

Broadcast
This half-hour program was broadcast on Saturdays at 1:30 p.m. (Eastern) from 15 September to 29 December 1979.

References

External links
 

1979 Canadian television series debuts
1979 Canadian television series endings
CBC Television original programming